Bearhole Ditch is a  long 2nd order tributary to Dirickson Creek, in Sussex County, Delaware.

Variant names
According to the Geographic Names Information System, it has also been known historically as:  
Bear Hole Ditch
Dirickson Creek

Course
Bearhole Ditch rises on the Vines Creek divide about 1 mile north of Selbyville in Sussex County, Delaware.  Bearhole Ditch then flows generally east to meet Dirickson Creek about 0.1 miles north of Johnson, Delaware.

Watershed
Bearhole Ditch drains  of area, receives about 44.8 in/year of precipitation, has a topographic wetness index of 723.32 and is about 3.5% forested.

See also
List of rivers of Delaware

References 

Rivers of Delaware